Cardiff Bay railway station, formerly Cardiff Bute Road, is a station serving the Cardiff Bay and Butetown areas of Cardiff, Wales.

Only one platform is now in use. The station building lies on Bute Street, although the rest of the station remains visible from the nearby Lloyd George Avenue. For various reasons, including it being the origin of the first steam-powered passenger train service in Wales, the station is a Grade II* listed building.

Passenger services are provided by Transport for Wales.

History 
The line to the docks was opened on 9 October 1840 but the station was not mentioned in Bradshaw's railway timetables until December 1844.  It was opened as Cardiff Bute Dock but the name was changed to Cardiff Docks in 1845 by the Taff Vale Railway (engineer: Isambard Kingdom Brunel).

The station building came into use in 1843 and was the head office of the TVR until 1862, when new offices were built at Queen Street. After this it was let to the consulates of the Netherlands, Belgium, Portugal and Brazil, with separate flagpoles provided for each nation.

The station was renamed Cardiff Bute Road by the Great Western Railway on 1 July 1924 and given its present name in 1994.

Renovation of station building

Use as a railway museum

The building was restored in the 1980s and served for a time as a railway museum under the auspices of the National Museums and Galleries of Wales and the Butetown Historical Railway Society (which in 1997 relocated its activities to the Vale of Glamorgan Railway). Following this, the station building had become derelict, with train passengers using a temporary shelter.

Residential and commercial property

In August 2017, plans were approved to renovate and convert the derelict 1840s building, and construct a four-storey building alongside it. The new building would house 10 flats, offices and a cafe. The Victorian Society said the Bute Street station was one of the oldest and most significant railway structures in Wales and in the previous year appeared on its list of the 10 most endangered buildings. It said it supported a sensitive restoration scheme but the current proposal would cause a "high degree of harm to the building and its setting". The first stage of the development opened in June 2019.

Services 

There is a shuttle service between Cardiff Queen Street and Cardiff Bay every 12 minutes Monday to Saturdays (between 0630 and 2330) and every 12 minutes on Sundays (between 1100 and 1630) using Class 153 Sprinters. Some services were operated by a Class 121 "bubble car" until it was withdrawn in June 2013.

Modernisation 
In June 2018, the then future Welsh train operating company KeolisAmey Wales announced plans to build a line extension and a terminus station, The Flourish (since renamed back to Cardiff Bay) for the Butetown Branch, along with an intermediate station at Loudoun Square. This station would have completely replaced the existing station, which would have closed.

Plans have since been revised, and in August 2022 it was proposed to construct the two-platform Loudoun Square station further to the north, and to retain Cardiff Bay station in its present location, but to add a second platform. The station will be served by more frequent tram-train vehicles from spring 2024. The line will form part of the South Wales Metro.

See also
 Clarence Road railway station
 Rail transport in Cardiff

References

External links 

Grade II* listed buildings in Cardiff
Grade II* listed railway stations in Wales
Bay
Former Taff Vale Railway stations
DfT Category F1 stations
Railway stations in Great Britain opened in 1840
Railway stations served by Transport for Wales Rail
Butetown
1840 establishments in the United Kingdom